Kendall railway station is located on the North Coast line in New South Wales, Australia. It serves the town of Kendall, opening on 12 April 1915 when the line was extended from Taree to Wauchope. In 1917, a locomotive depot was established.

Platforms & services
Kendall has one platform. Each day northbound XPT services operate to Grafton, Casino and Brisbane, with three southbound services operating to Sydney. This station is a request stop for the Casino and Brisbane XPT's, so these services stop here only if passengers have booked to board/alight here.

References

External links
Kendall station details Transport for New South Wales

Easy Access railway stations in New South Wales
Railway stations in Australia opened in 1915
Regional railway stations in New South Wales
North Coast railway line, New South Wales